The Royal West of England Academy (RWA) is Bristol's oldest art gallery, located in Clifton, Bristol, near the junction of Queens Road and Whiteladies Road. Situated in a Grade 2* listed building, it hosts five galleries and an exhibition programme that celebrates the best of historic and contemporary British art.

Elected Royal West of England Academicians use the post-nominal RWA.

History 

The Royal West of England Academy was the first art gallery to be established in Bristol, and is one of the longest-running regional galleries and art schools in the UK. Its foundation was initiated by the extraordinary Ellen Sharples, who secured funding from benefactors including Isambard Kingdom Brunel and Prince Albert, and the building was ultimately financed by a bequest of £2,000 from her will in 1849.

At first, the core of the Academy was a well-known group of artists in Bristol, known as the Bristol Society of Artists, who were mostly landscape painters, and many, such as William James Müller, Francis Danby, James Baker Pyne and John Syer were well known. In 1844, when the Bristol Academy for the Promotion of Fine Arts was founded, the Bristol Society of Artists was incorporated into it. At this time the president and committee was predominantly its patrons, rather than its artists. In 1913 King George V granted the academy its Royal title, with the reigning monarch as its Patron, and by 1914 a major extension to the front of the building, including the dome and Walter Crane lunettes, was completed.

During World War II the academy building was taken over by various organisations including the Bristol Aeroplane Company and the U.S. Army. Immediately after the war ended the council applied for the release of the galleries but was informed that they would be occupied by the Inland Revenue until further notice. It was not until 1950 that the building was returned to its original function, after the intervention of the then prime minister, Clement Attlee. During the 1950s the Royal West of England Academy Schools became the West of England College of Art. This moved to the Bower Ashton campus in 1966, where it was then absorbed by the University of the West of England (School of Visual Studies), now the Department of Creative Industries, UWE, Bristol.

The current president is the artist Fiona Robinson PRWA and Director (Chief Exec) is Alison Bevan BEM.

Collections 

Among the paintings in the permanent collection are works by artists from the Newlyn, St Ives and Bloomsbury Schools and paintings by Elizabeth Blackadder, Bernard Dunstan, Mary Fedden, Matthew Hale, David Inshaw, Derek Balmer, Anne Redpath, George Swaish and Carel Weight.

Building 

The building is a grade II* listed building constructed in 1857 as the city's first public art gallery, also encompassing an art school. It opened in 1858. The interiors are by Charles Underwood and facade by JR Hirst, altered in 1912 by SS Reay and H Dare Bryan. The first floor is in 3 sections, the outer ones articulated by paired Corinthian pilasters flanking large shell head niches with statues of Flaxman and Reynolds. A large carving of 3 female figures - the three graces - crowns the parapet. The interior includes coloured marble and a replica of the Parthenon Frieze.

Membership 

As a Royal Academy of Art, the RWA is governed by professional artists, with a membership of around 150 Academicians who are elected by their peers.

Types of membership

Presidents

References

External links 

 RWA's website

Art museums and galleries in Bristol
British art
Culture in Bristol
Grade II* listed buildings in Bristol
Tourist attractions in Bristol
Museums in Bristol
1844 establishments in England
Organisations based in Bristol with royal patronage
Art museums established in 1844
Grade II* listed museum buildings
Academies of arts